Drumcree is a small village in County Westmeath in Ireland on the R395 regional road. This village is part of St Mary's Parish, Collinstown, and a sister parish of St Feichin's, Fore.

The village is situated upon a crossroads, fringes parts of the Barbavilla Bog, the Glackstown Bog, and Mullacruaigh bog, all of which have been harvested for winter fuel for generations by the neighbouring communities.

References

Towns and villages in County Westmeath